Toxicology Letters is a peer-reviewed scientific journal for the rapid publication of short reports on all aspects of toxicology, especially mechanisms of toxicity. Toxicology Letters is the official journal of Eurotox. (Eurotox  exists as a Society within the meaning of Art. 60 et seq. of the Swiss Civil Code. The registered address of Eurotox is in Basel.)

Editors-in-chief are Wolfgang Dekant (Julius-Maximilians-Universität Würzburg, Germany), Scott Garrett, University of North Dakota, and  Yunbo Li (Edward Via College of Osteopathic Medicine, Virginia). James P. Kehrer is editor emeritus (Washington State University, USA, retired).

According to the Journal Citation Reports, Toxicology Letters has a 2020 impact factor of 4.372.

References

External links 
 
 Website of EUROTOX

Elsevier academic journals
Semi-monthly journals
English-language journals
Publications established in 1977
Toxicology journals